Yusuf Adil Shah (1450–1510), referred as Adil Khan or Hidalcão by the Portuguese, was the founder of the Adil Shahi dynasty that ruled the Sultanate of Bijapur for nearly two centuries. As the founder of the newly formed Bijapur dynasty (as the Adil Shahi dynasty is also known), Yusuf Adil Shah is credited with developing the town of Bijapur and elevating it to significant status. He was married to daughter of Maratha King.

Legend of origin
The founder of the dynasty, Yusuf Adil Shah, may have been a Georgian slave who was purchased by Mahmud Gawan from Iran. Other historians mentioned him of Persian or Turkmen origin.

Some historians state Yusuf was a son of the Ottoman Sultan Murad II. The partisan sectarian panegyrist Ferishta states that Yusuf was a fugitive son of the Ottoman Sultan Murad II, a story which was related to him by Mirza Mohamed of Sava and Khwaja Nuzr, a member of the ruling Bahmani dynasty. Ferishta also stated that this origin was related by Shah Jamaluddin Hussain himself. Rafiuddin Shirazi, author of Tazkirat ul Mulk, states Yusuf was the nephew of Governor Ahmed Baig of Sava. Another theory states he was a Turkman of the Aq-Quyunlu.

Career
Yusuf's bravery and personality raised him rapidly in the Bahmani sultan's favor, and resulted in his being appointed Governor of Bijapur.

In 1489, Yusuf took advantage of the decline of the Bahmani power to establish himself as an independent sultan at Bijapur. He waged war against the Vijayanagar empire, as also against Bijapur's Muslim neighbours.

Adil Shah is personally responsible for building the imposing Citadel or Arkilla and the palace named Faroukh Mahal. Yusuf was a man of culture and invited poets and artisans from Persia, Turkey and Rome to his court. He was also an accomplished musician and scholar with deep religious tolerance that was reflected in art and architecture from this time.

Adil Shah died in 1509 in an expedition against the Vijayanagara empire to the south. The practice was initiated by Sultan Mahmood Shah Bahmani II in 1501, in which all the Bahmani chieftains participated. However, in 1509, Krishnadevaraya ascended the throne of Vijayanagara. He countered the Bahmani expedition at a location called Dewani (unidentified) and decisively defeated it. The Sultan was thrown off the horse and had to be carried away from the battlefield. Raya then pursued the retreating army of Bijapur. Adil Shah turned around to give him battle at Koilkonda, in which he was killed.

His death occurred shortly after the loss of Goa to the Portuguese governor Afonso de Albuquerque. He was succeeded by his son Ismail Adil Shah, who being a minor, was aided in his rule by a certain Kamal Khan.

Yusuf left behind a strong if small state, one which persisted through two relatively chaotic centuries in a region rife with political ferment. The Bijapur sultanate he founded was a formidable force for close to two centuries until it succumbed to Maratha power and finally resolved by Aurangzeb in 1686 in an ineffective bid to check Maratha power.

Family
Yusuf Adil Shah married Poonji (Punji), the sister of a Maratha lord Mukundrao Kadamba, later renamed Bubuji Khanum. By this marriage he had a son and three daughters:
Ismail Adil Shah, Sultan of Bijapur;
Mariam Sultan, married Burhan Nizam Shah I, Sultan of Ahmednagar;
Khadija Sultan, married Aladdin Imad Shah, Sultan of Berar;
Bibi Sati, married Ahmad Shah, son of Mahmood Shah Bahmani II;

Notes

Bibliography

Further reading 

 India History
 Wakiyate Mamlakate Bijapur by Basheeruddin Dehelvi.
 Tareekhe Farishta by Kasim Farishta
 External Relation of Bijapur Adil Shahis.
 Devare, T. N. A short history of Persian literature; at the Bahmani, the Adilshahi, and the Qutbshahi courts. Poona: S. Devare, 1961.

1459 births
1511 deaths
15th-century Indian monarchs
Indian Muslims
Indian Shia Muslims
People from  Kalaburagi district
Adil Shahi dynasty
1511 in India
Year of death uncertain
Indian people of Georgian descent
Ethnic Turkmen people
Indian people of Iranian descent
Indian people of Turkish descent
16th-century Indian monarchs